International Railway Station can refer to:

The railway station in Sydney, Australia: International railway station, Sydney
The railway station in Brisbane, Australia: International Terminal railway station, Brisbane
An alternative name for any railway station in the United Kingdom and Ireland that serves International trains (for example, St Pancras railway station which is known as St Pancras International)